The American Football Kicking Hall of Fame was created in 2008 to recognize individuals who have excelled as kickers, to educate the public on the historic contributions of the kicking game and to promote the advancement of kickers (placekickers or punters) in American football.

The American Football Kicking Hall of Fame features two categories – athletes and contributors. Athletes are individuals who have played football and kicked at an elite level. Contributors can be a coach or any other individual who has greatly contributed to the success of kicking in American football.

Eighteen people have been inducted into the American Football Kicking Hall of Fame. Of them, six are also in the Pro Football Hall of Fame, some of whom were inducted into the latter for non-kicking achievements.

The annual induction ceremony is during the Augusta (Ga.) Sports Council's All-Area Football Banquet in January.

Inductees

References

External links
 

Halls of fame in Georgia (U.S. state)
Sports hall of fame inductees
+

American football in Georgia (U.S. state)
Augusta, Georgia
Awards established in 2008
2008 establishments in Georgia (U.S. state)